Cyril Joseph Cahill (February 22, 1883 – after 1933) was a lawyer and politician. He represented Harbour Main in the Newfoundland House of Assembly from 1924 to 1928.

The son of Patrick Cahill and Bridget Burke, he was born in St. Pierre, Newfoundland and was educated at Saint Bonaventure's College. He articled with Frank Lilly, was called to the Newfoundland bar in 1908 and set up practice in St. John's. Cahill was an agent for Fidelity (Fire) Underwriters of New York and Newfoundland manager for the Crown Life Insurance Company of Canada. From 1921 to 1924, Cahill was Newfoundland state deputy for the Knights of Columbus. He was elected to the Newfoundland assembly in 1924. The Cahill family moved to Placentia in 1933.

In 1912, Cahill married Mary Fitzpatrick.

His son Tom became a playwright, television producer, and screenwriter.

References 

1883 births
Year of death missing
Members of the Newfoundland and Labrador House of Assembly
Dominion of Newfoundland politicians